Andy Prieboy (born April 17, 1955) is an American musician, songwriter, and author. He was lead singer of the band Wall of Voodoo from 1983 to 1988. Later, he produced solo albums, musicals, and a novel.

Life and career
Prieboy was born in Los Angeles and raised in East Chicago, Indiana. Early in his career, he was in the San Francisco art band Eye Protection, which had one track on the compilation Rising Stars of San Francisco: "Take Her Where The Boys Are". They also recorded a 7-inch single called "Elroy Jetson" with a b-side of "Go Go Girl" on Eleph Records.

In 1983, he replaced Stan Ridgway as lead vocalist of Wall of Voodoo.  Seven Days in Sammystown was the first Wall of Voodoo album to feature Prieboy, which was followed by Happy Planet, and finally The Ugly Americans in Australia (a live album recorded to fulfill their recording obligations to IRS Records).

His first Wall of Voodoo single "Far Side of Crazy" is featured in the film Head Office. His demo for the song "Man Talk", which would finally appear on the album ...Upon My Wicked Son, was featured in the early Brad Pitt film Cutting Class as well as other unreleased Wall of Voodoo demos.  These same demos appeared in the film C.H.U.D. II: Bud the C.H.U.D.. He also appears in the film Blood and Concrete along with a few of his original songs (in that movie, Jennifer Beals sings his song, "One Girl in a Million").

After leaving Wall of Voodoo, Prieboy signed with MCA Music Publishing as a songwriter and went to work on new material for his first solo record ...Upon My Wicked Son, which featured the song "Tomorrow Wendy," about a woman dying of AIDS. The song featured a duet with Johnette Napolitano, whose band Concrete Blonde also recorded the song and released it on their album Bloodletting the same year. The music video was directed by Thomas Mignone. MTV initially rejected the song's lyrical content and tone but Prieboy and Mignone decided to feature the decaying cities of Hammond and Gary in Indiana as the "Wendy" character and the video received Buzz Bin status at MTV. The song was also covered by the industrial project System Syn in early 2000s. Linda Ronstadt and Emmylou Harris covered his song "Loving the Highway Man" from the same album.  Prieboy then released an EP called Montezuma Was a Man of Faith which featured a country rendition of "Whole Lotta Love" by Led Zeppelin, featuring an uncredited Johnette Napolitano from Concrete Blonde. Prieboy's second solo album was entitled Sins of Our Fathers.

In the mid-to-late '90s, Prieboy played shows at the Los Angeles club Largo with Rita D'Albert where they worked on an ongoing musical, White Trash Wins Lotto; a Gilbert and Sullivan-esque treatment of the rise and fall of an Axl Rose-like character. It was also performed at the Roxy Theatre on the Sunset Strip for three sold out weekend-long engagements as well as two sold out weekends at New York City's PS 122. Prieboy and crew also performed a medley from White Trash on the Conan O'Brien show.

Prieboy is also the co-author with Merrill Markoe of the novel The Psycho Ex Game, based on his song "Psycho Ex". Markoe and Prieboy have lived together since 2004.

He released several songs via his website for online purchase. In 2012 Prieboy released the four-song downloadable EP Every Lady Gets A Song, featuring accompaniment by former Dils bassist Tony Kinman and Devo drummer David Kendrick.

On December 20, 2016, he released his lost album Virtue Triumphs. The album was left unfinished and abandoned in 1992; it was meant to be the follow-up to his first solo work, ...Upon My Wicked Son. A corporate regime change ultimately swept him out, and the album stayed behind. This was his first body of work that was not beholden to Wall of Voodoo.

Discography

Studio albums

EPs

Singles

References

External links

 The Psycho Ex Game
 Andy Prieboy's website
 

Living people
American male singer-songwriters
American rock singers
Songwriters from Indiana
People from East Chicago, Indiana
1955 births
Wall of Voodoo members